Anapisa crenophylax is a moth of the family Erebidae. It was described by William Jacob Holland in 1893. It is found in Cameroon, the Republic of Congo and Gabon.

References

Moths described in 1893
Syntomini
Insects of Cameroon
Fauna of the Republic of the Congo
Fauna of Gabon
Moths of Africa